Convoy HX 106 was the 106th of the numbered series of Allied HX convoys of merchant ships from Halifax, Nova Scotia to Liverpool, England. Forty-one ships departed Halifax, Nova Scotia on 30 January 1941, eastbound to Liverpool, England.  The use of convoys was a standard tactic throughout the Battle of the Atlantic as a defence against U-boats and German commerce raiders.

The German squadron was under the command of Admiral Günther Lütjens. The captain of Scharnhorst offered to draw off the escorting Royal Navy battleship , so that Gneisenau could sink the merchant ships. This strategy, if successful, would have entailed little risk to Scharnhorst as she was  faster than Ramillies, and her newer  guns outranged the 1915 era  guns of the British ship. However, Lutjens strictly followed Hitler's directive not to engage enemy capital ships, and withdrew.

Later, two of the convoy's merchant ships were sunk by the submarine , including Arthur F. Corwin loaded with 14,500 tons of aviation fuel. She went down on 13 February, taking all 59 crew with her.

Ships in the convoy

Allied merchant ships
A total of 41 merchant vessels joined the convoy, either in Halifax or later in the voyage.

Convoy escorts
A series of armed military ships escorted the convoy at various times during its journey.

References

HX106
Naval battles of World War II involving Canada
C